Gas is one of the four main physical states of matter (plural "gases" or "gasses").

Gas or GAS may also refer to:

Science

Biology and healthcare
 Streptococcus pyogenes, a bacterium commonly known as Group A Strep, or GAS
 Gas, slang for an anaesthetic
 General Adaptation Syndrome, a model describing responses to stress
 Global Assessment Scale, later Global Assessment of Functioning, in mental health
 Goal attainment scaling, a method for monitoring client progress in therapy
 Group A streptococcal infection
 Intestinal gas

Chemistry, physics, and energy 
 Gas, short for gasoline
 Fuel gas
 Coal gas
 Natural gas
 Oil and gas
 GaS, chemical formula for gallium(II) sulfide

People 
 Gas Lipstick, the drummer for the Finnish rock band HIM
 Gunnar A. Sjögren, a Swedish engineer

Arts, entertainment, and media

Films 
 Gas (1944 film), a Private Snafu animated short
 Gas (1981 film), a Canadian comedy film
 Gas (2004 film), an American film
 Gas-s-s-s (1971), also called Gas! or It Became Necessary to Destroy the World in Order to Save It, a Roger Corman movie

Music 
 Pseudonym of English electronic musician Mat Jarvis
 Gas (musician), musical project of German producer Wolfgang Voigt
 Gas (Feedtime album), 2017

Television 
 "Gas" (Bottom), an episode of the UK series Bottom
 "Gas", an episode of the UK series Casualty
 Nickelodeon Games and Sports for Kids (Nick Gas), a former TV network

Other uses in arts, entertainment, and media 
 Gas (painting), by Edward Hopper, 1940.
 Gas (comic), a British adult comic.
 Cinema Unit Gas, founded in 1988 by Akira Takatsuki.
 Gas — short story by Alfred Hitchcock.

Brands and enterprises
 Galpin Auto Sports, a US customizing garage
 Gas Jeans, an Italian clothing label

Computing and technology 
 Gas (app), an American anonymous social media app
 Transaction pricing mechanism in Ethereum
 Generalized audit software
 Getaway Special, an experiment bay on the NASA Space Shuttle
 GNU Assembler, a software tool
 Gunner's Auxiliary Sight of the M1 Abrams tank

Geography 
 Gas, Eure-et-Loir, France, a commune
 Gas, Iran (disambiguation), various villages
 Gas, Kansas, United States, a town

Sports
 Bristol Rovers FC, England, nickname
 Grêmio Atlético Sampaio, a Brazilian football club

See also 
 Gassed (painting), by John Singer Sargent, 1919
 Gass (disambiguation)
 Gassing (disambiguation)
 :Category:Gases